In philately, a pen cancel – symbol  – is a cancellation of a postage or revenue stamp by the use of a pen, marker or crayon.

Usage 
In the early days of stamps, cancellation with a pen was common. Today stamps are almost always cancelled with an inked handstamp or a machine cancel as this is quicker to apply. Pen cancels are still sometimes seen today when a postal official needs to cancel stamps missed by the automatic cancelling machine.

There are no fixed terms for the different types of pen cancels, but a cancel in the form of two crossed lines has been referred to as an X cancel. Pen cancels may also take the form of notations by the canceller, the city in which the item was posted or the initials of the local postmaster.

A pen cancel may indicate fiscal (revenue) use; however, in the early days of stamps a pen cancel was sometimes used because no handstamp was available, for instance in Nicaragua where pen cancels were used for seven years after their first stamps appeared in 1862.

Values 
A used postage stamp with a pen cancel is usually worth much less than a stamp cancelled using a handstamp or machine. In particular, the additional information from the handstamp is lost and the pen cancel may indicate fiscal (revenue) rather than postal use. Pen cancelling is, however, a common method of cancelling stamps used fiscally. Stamps marked valid for both postage and revenue use are usually worth less when fiscally used.

Tampering 
Some people have attempted to remove pen cancels from used stamps in order to make them appear as more valuable mint stamps.

References

External links
1847 Issue with Pen Cancel.
A Pen Cancel used by a postal employee to "kill" the stamps.

Philatelic terminology